Joseph Glannon, J.D. is a professor at Suffolk University Law School and author of several legal guides.  He has taught courses in civil procedure, conflict of laws, and torts at Suffolk since 1980.
  
He received a Bachelor of Arts in English, a Master of Arts in Teaching and Juris Doctor from Harvard University.  Before attending law school, Glannon served as an assistant dean of men and coordinator of student activities at Bates College in Lewiston, Maine. After graduating from Harvard Law, Glannon was a clerk for the Massachusetts Appeals Court.

Bibliography
 The Glannon Guide to Civil Procedure, 6th Edition
 Civil Procedure Examples & Explanations
 Torts: Examples and Explanation

References

Living people
Harvard Law School alumni
Suffolk University Law School faculty
Year of birth missing (living people)
Place of birth missing (living people)
Lawyers from Cambridge, Massachusetts
Scholars of civil procedure law
American legal scholars